The Cape Breton Oilers were a professional ice hockey team in the American Hockey League. The team was the top minor league affiliate of the Edmonton Oilers of the National Hockey League (NHL). The Oilers' organization relocated the team from Halifax, Nova Scotia, in 1988 and renamed it for Cape Breton Island. Home games were played at Centre 200 in Sydney, Nova Scotia, Canada. The Oilers' organization relocated the team to Ontario in 1996 to become the Hamilton Bulldogs.

History
For eight seasons (1988–1996) they were the primary farm team of the Edmonton Oilers which was reflected in their logo and uniform design. While the Oilers never finished the regular season atop either their division or the league, they did capture the Calder Cup during the 1992–93 playoffs. The Cape Breton Oilers played in the rink by the name of Centre 200, now the home of the Cape Breton Eagles.

Demise of the AHL in Atlantic Canada
When the Cape Breton Oilers vacated Nova Scotia for Hamilton in 1996 and became the Hamilton Bulldogs, it marked the beginning of the end for AHL hockey in Atlantic Canada for a time. Shortly thereafter, the Prince Edward Island Senators were suspended and eventually landed in New York as the Binghamton Senators. In 1999, the Fredericton Canadiens also moved west to become the Quebec Citadelles, later swapping its history with the Bulldogs and eventually ending up in Toronto, Edmonton, and Oklahoma. The Saint John Flames suspended operations in 2003 and then departed New Brunswick in 2005, eventually landing in Omaha, Nebraska for two seasons before moving to the Quad Cities and then to Abbotsford, British Columbia. The St. John's Maple Leafs were the last to leave the region in this wave, moving from Newfoundland and Labrador to Toronto in 2005 and being renamed the Marlies. The AHL would not return to Atlantic Canada until 2011 with the St. John's IceCaps.

1992–93 Calder Cup
The Cape Breton Oilers 1992–93 playoffs was one of the most dominant in AHL history. In particular, during the 1993 playoffs, the Oilers posted a record of 14 wins and two losses, and were led by a playoff performance by forward Bill McDougall that remains virtually unparalleled in professional hockey to this date.

During the 16 games, McDougall scored 26 goals, and added 26 assists for 52 points. Fourteen years later, his records for goals, assists and points all stand, and his total of 3.25 points per game, is more than was ever matched in the NHL. Wayne Gretzky holds the NHL record with 47 points.

Season-by-season results
 Nova Scotia Oilers 1984–1988
 Cape Breton Oilers 1988–1996

Regular season

Playoffs

Team records

Single season
Goals: 57, Dan Currie (1992–93)
Assists: 84, Shaun Van Allen (1991–92)
Points: 113, Shaun Van Allen (1991–92)
Penalty minutes: 422, Dennis Bonvie (1994–95)
GAA: 3.38, Mike Greenlay (1989–90)
SV%: .899, Eldon Reddick (1990–91)
Wins: 20, Wayne Cowley (1993–94)
Shutouts: 3, Jason Fitzsimmons (1995–96)

Career
Career goals: 219, Dan Currie
Career assists: 307, Shaun Van Allen
Career points: 432, Shaun Van Allen
Career penalty minutes: 969, Dennis Bonvie
Career goaltending wins: 35, Norm Foster
Career shutouts: 3, Jason Fitzsimmons
Career games: 366, Dan Currie

Notable NHL alumni
List of Cape Breton Oilers alumni who played more than 100 games in Cape Breton and 100 or more games in the National Hockey League.

See also
List of ice hockey teams in Nova Scotia

External links
The Internet Hockey Database - Cape Breton Oilers

 
1986 establishments in Nova Scotia
1996 disestablishments in Nova Scotia
Edmonton Oilers minor league affiliates
Ice hockey clubs established in 1988
Ice hockey clubs disestablished in 1996